ROF Fazakerley was a Royal Ordnance Factory rifle manufacturing plant in Fazakerley, Liverpool, which manufactured small arms such as the Sten and Sterling submachine guns and Lee–Enfield rifle during and after World War II.

ROF Fazakerley and ROF Maltby were established before World War II to increase arms production facilities in areas less vulnerable to aerial attack. The main Royal Small Arms Factory for rifle manufacture was in Enfield, London.

References

Buildings and structures in Liverpool
Military history of Lancashire
Royal Ordnance Factories in England
Engineering ROF
1930s in Liverpool
1940s in Liverpool